Pseudolais is a genus of shark catfishes native to Southeast Asia.

Species
There are currently two recognized species in this genus:
 Pseudolais micronemus (Bleeker, 1846) (Shortbarbel pangasius)
 Pseudolais pleurotaenia (Sauvage, 1878)

References

Pangasiidae
Fish of Asia
Catfish genera
Taxa named by Léon Vaillant
Freshwater fish genera